Michele Castagnetti (born 27 December 1989) is an Italian professional footballer who plays as a midfielder for  club Cremonese.

Biography
Michele started his career at U.S. Montecchio before moving to Termolan Bibbiano, an Italian amateur team, where he played in the Eccellenza Emilia-Romagna league. In August 2007 he signed for the Serie B team Mantova. At Mantova he joined the Primavera squad. After completing that season he left for Crociati Noceto where he won the Serie D Group D.

Following that season, Michele kept playing in Noceto and completed two season in Seconda Divisione. After Crociati Noceto withdrew from 2011–12 Lega Pro Seconda Divisione. he joined Prima Divisione newcomer FeralpiSalò where he met Andrea Tedeschi who trained him at Termolan Bibbiano.

In September 2013 he signes for the Seconda Divisione team Cosenza Calcio.

In January 2014 he returns in Prima Divisione signing for Carrarese Calcio.

On 2 July 2018 he signed a three-year contract with Serie B club Cremonese. On 16 March 2021,he scored a goal from 70 yards out against Virtus Entella.

On 16 March 2021 he scored an extraordinary goal deep from within his own half after the ball bounced once after a clearance from Virtus Entella's goalkeeper. Castagnetti struck the ball sweetly and ferociously with his left foot as it looped high over everyone on the pitch, including Entella's keeper. The ball didn't bounce after leaving his foot and ending up in the back of the net that healed his side won 2–1.

Honours
 Serie D: 2009
 Serie C: 2016
 Serie B: 2017

References

External links
 Football.it Profile  
 
 

1989 births
Sportspeople from the Province of Reggio Emilia
Sportspeople from Reggio Emilia
Living people
Italian footballers
Association football midfielders
Mantova 1911 players
Crociati Noceto players
FeralpiSalò players
Cosenza Calcio players
Carrarese Calcio players
S.P.A.L. players
Empoli F.C. players
U.S. Cremonese players
Serie B players
Serie C players
Serie D players
Footballers from Emilia-Romagna